Kirill Olegovich Starkov (Russian:Кирилл Олегович Старков; born 31 March 1987) is a Russian-born Danish professional ice hockey forward who is currently playing for HC Château-d'Oex in the Swiss 2. Liga, the fifth tier of the Swiss hockey system. 

He has previously played for CSKA Moscow, Syracuse Crunch, Youngstown Steelhounds, Red Deer Rebels, Frölunda HC, Timrå IK, Esbjerg IK, IK Oskarshamn and HC Red Ice.

Playing career
Starkov's father Oleg was also a professional hockey player who played for CSKA Moscow and Sverdlovsk Avtomobilist before moving to Denmark to play for Esbjerg IK. As a result, Kirill was born in Russia to Russian parents but spent most of his childhood in Esbjerg. After turning eighteen, Kirill applied for and received Danish citizenship, making him eligible to play for the Danish national ice hockey team. He first represented Denmark at the 2007 IIHF World Championship in Moscow, Russia.

Kirill Starkov was named Rookie of the Year of the Danish Elite League for the 2002-03 season. While playing for various junior teams for Frölunda HC, he won the Swedish Junior 18 national championships in 2004 and 2005 as well as the Swedish Junior 20 national title in 2005.

In 2014, Starkov was suspended for 4 games for breaking the etiquette rules set by the Danish Federation while playing for Esbjerg in the Danish Elite League.
Kirill did not have any effect on the match in question. But breaking the rules set by the Danish Federation gave him a 4 games suspension. He returned to the Danish National team 10 months later and played 2 World Championships.

Starkov continued his career in Switzerland and RedIce Martigny where he, as captain of the team, took the team to 2 semifinals.
He later coached RedIce Martigny in the 2017 playoffs
Kirill also became the Swiss div 2 Champion with HC Martigny and has now legendary status in the local area

Career statistics

Regular season and playoffs

International

References

External links
 

1987 births
Columbus Blue Jackets draft picks
Danish ice hockey right wingers
EfB Ishockey players
Esbjerg Energy players
Elmira Jackals (ECHL) players
Expatriate ice hockey players in Russia
Frölunda HC players
HC CSKA Moscow players
HC Red Ice players
Rögle BK players
Russian emigrants to Denmark
Living people
Naturalised citizens of Denmark
IK Oskarshamn players
Red Deer Rebels players
Syracuse Crunch players
Youngstown Steelhounds players
Sportspeople from Yekaterinburg